Megaton is a fictional town in the video game Fallout 3, part of the post-apocalyptic Fallout franchise. Located in the Capital Wasteland, the former Washington metropolitan area, Megaton is a fortified settlement housing dozens of survivors from a devastating nuclear war, constructed out of scrap metal and other scavenged materials. It is roughly situated in McLean, Virginia. Megaton has gained recognition from critics for its visual design, its inhabitants, as well as a quest, The Power of the Atom, involving a dud "C-23 Megaton" nuclear bomb located in the center of town. While the townspeople believe the bomb to be inert, it is revealed that the warhead is still primed. The player may choose to disarm the bomb permanently, or detonate it from the nearby Tenpenny Tower to appease Allistair Tenpenny, an eccentric entrepreneur who wants Megaton destroyed. This moral choice, which can result in Megaton's permanent annihilation and the deaths of most of its residents, proved controversial and led to the game being censored for Japanese audiences, due to the atomic bombings of Hiroshima and Nagasaki.

Reception 
Drew Toal of The A.V. Club called Megaton "one of the better crappy post-apocalypse communities", citing it as an alternative to the Vaults, hermetically sealed bunkers with a "mildly fascistic and sterile existence". Saying that "the citizens of Megaton have learned to depend on the person next to them to get along", he called Megaton "in many ways [...] the ideal post-apocalyptic neighborhood." Citing the town's inhabitants, including its sheriff Lucas Simms, he says that Megaton "has all the charm of Mayberry, without white picket fences, Little League fields, or trappings of civil society," calling it "downright quaint when considered alongside other end-times groups".

GamesRadar+ called Megaton Fallout 3's scrappiest location but also its most beautiful, saying that "in terms of iconic locations in the series nothing quite compares to Megaton". However, they criticized its complicated design, stating that "one notable frustration of Megaton is that you can just about see all of the place at once [...] yet never quite get the measure of it." Nevertheless, they also stated that "Megaton epitomises Fallout 3’s grand adventure in the building of open-world forts".

In response to the Power of the Atom quest, GamesRadar+ called it "game-defining", as well as "game-redefining [...] if you live in Japan." Citing the fact that the Japanese ratings board modified the quest so the bomb was permanently defused, the publication called the censorship evidence of the country's "gaping cultural wounds", despite the game having been "voted one of the top ten RPGs ever by readers of Famitsu". Calling the quest "the power of Megaton, which would amount to very little had Bethesda not followed it to its bitter end", GamesRadar+ states that if the player follows through with the quest, "the horrors of the game’s backstory are wrought in realtime on characters you could almost call friends".

The publication states that players often "take back" their choice after "call[ing] the game's bluff"; upon gaining an apartment in Tenpenny Tower as a reward, they kill Allistair Tenpenny and the rest of the tower's residents as revenge, then reload their save, effectively "killing themselves". Asking whether the game has "no real consequence", they ask whether the player would rather have Megaton's destruction be a "permanent feature" or "a nightmare that ends with a quick reboot".

G.B. Burford of Kotaku stated that Megaton "is an interesting location, one of plenty in a game loaded with places that have their own personality and flavor," singling out the quest-giver Moira Brown and saying that "the Wasteland Survival Guide sidequests" she provides the player are "a fantastic way to get an introduction to the world". Robert Purchese of Eurogamer called Megaton one of the best "destructible objects" in gaming, saying that "the main reason the destruction of Megaton has stuck with me" was that "I didn't really have to blow it up". He stated that when he "revisit[ed] the location" and spoke to the only survivor, "a newly ghoulified Moira", he was "confronted by the consequences of my actions".

IGN ranked the nuking of Megaton number 42 in its list of the most unforgettable video game moments of all time, with Brendan Graeber discussing its significance in exploring the consequences of the player's actions in a video game.

References

External links
Megaton at The Vault, the Fallout wiki

Fallout (series)
Video game locations
Fictional populated places in Virginia
McLean, Virginia in fiction